Cousin Bobby is a 1992 American documentary film directed by Jonathan Demme. The film focuses on Demme's cousin, Robert W. Castle, an Episcopalian minister in Harlem, New York. It was screened in the Un Certain Regard section at the 1992 Cannes Film Festival.

Cast
 Robert W. Castle

References

External links

1992 films
1992 documentary films
American documentary films
American independent films
Documentary films about Christianity in the United States
Films directed by Jonathan Demme
Films shot in New York City
Films set in Harlem
1990s English-language films
1990s American films